The Monte San Salvatore funicular, or Funicolare Monte San Salvatore, is a funicular railway in the city of Lugano in the Swiss canton of Ticino. The line links a lower station in the Lugano suburb of Paradiso with an upper station at the summit of the Monte San Salvatore. The top yields a 360° panorama with views of the city, Lake Lugano, Monte Generoso and the Italian enclave of Campione.

The line was built in 1890, and originally used an Abt rack rail for braking. It was rebuilt in 1926, when the two-axle cars were replaced by four-axle cars capable of carrying 70 passengers each, and the Abt rail removed. The cars were again replaced in 1957. In 2001, the line was extensively modernised, with new engine, gearbox, brakes and control system, and the 1957-built cars were given a new modern style body.

The line has an unusual configuration of two separate single-track sections, with passengers transferring between cars at an intermediate station in Pazzallo. Each section has a single car, but there is only one engine and machine room which is located at Pazzallo, and the two cars counterbalance each other. The two cars are similar in design, but are not identical, being adapted to the different gradients of the two sections.

Just after leaving its lower terminal, the funicular crosses above Lugano-Paradiso railway station on a bridge. This station is some  walk to the south of the lower terminal.

The funicular is owned and operated by Funicolare Lugano-Paradiso-Monte San Salvatore SA.

The Monte San Salvatore funicular is one of three operational funiculars within the Lugano area. The other two are the Monte Brè funicular, which ascends Monte Brè on the opposite side of the city, and the Lugano Città–Stazione funicular, which links the city centre with the railway station.

Operation 
The line runs every 30 minutes, with a total journey time of approximately 12 minutes. It has the following parameters:

See also 
 List of funicular railways
 List of funiculars in Switzerland

References

External links 

Official web site of the Monte San Salvatore funicular
Article on the funicular from the Funimag online magazine
The Monte San Salvatore funicular's entry on the Swiss Inventory of Ropeways

San Salvatore
Transport in Lugano
Railway lines opened in 1890
Metre gauge railways in Switzerland